The 2007 Connecticut Huskies football team represented the University of Connecticut in the 2007 NCAA Division I FBS football season as a member of the Big East Conference. The team was coached by Randy Edsall and played its home games at Rentschler Field in East Hartford, Connecticut. This year the Huskies, for the first time, ended the season on the BCS rankings top 25 at #25, and at the height of their year were ranked #13, the highest at any point in their history.

Schedule

Game summaries

Duke

In a game that was a tale of two halves, the Huskies started the season with a 45–14 win against Duke, extending the Blue Devils' winless streak to twenty-one straight.

Maine

UConn improved its overall record to 2–0 for the fourth time in five years and its record in home openers at Rentschler Field to 5–0. This was the Huskies' first shutout since a 59–0 victory over Liberty in 2005.

Temple

In a game which the Huskies were heavily favored, it took the help of a rotund security guard to win the game. After taking the lead early in the fourth quarter, the Huskies fought off a last-minute drive by the Owls. On the final play of the game, Temple ran a wide receiver reverse pass, which was batted down in the end zone by UConn defensive back Robert Vaughn. However, on the deflection, the ball was caught by the Owls' Bruce Francis, who was ruled out of bounds. Replays on TV showed Francis did appear to get one foot inbounds; however, it is debatable whether he also had possession at that point. After an official review, the play was upheld. The replay angle which could have provided the conclusive evidence, both foot inbounds and possession, was obstructed by a security guard standing in the line of sight of the television camera. The Huskies improved to 3–0 for the first time since 1998.

Pittsburgh

The Huskies continued their dominance in a 34-14 victory over the Pittsburgh Panthers at Heinz Field. The victory marked the first time UConn had started 4-0 since 1997, as well as the first time the Huskies had won a Big East road opener. The victory was also the Huskies' second-ever win on the road within the conference.

Akron

Returning home to East Hartford, the Huskies held off the Zips to win their fifth straight game for the first time since 1995. The Huskies were led by running back Andre Dixon who scampered for 116 yards on 12 carries, as well as his first two touchdowns of his career. Junior college transfer quarterback Tyler Lorenzen contributed 203 yards and two touchdowns of his own.

Virginia

In a game which the winner was almost guaranteed a spot in the top 25, the Huskies came up just short. After allowing the go-ahead field goal with 3:20 left in the game the Huskies began the assault upfield. After a solid return, and two consecutive 11-yard runs by quarterback Tyler Lorenzen, the Huskies made the first of 3 costly mistakes allowing a snap from the shotgun formation to go whizzing by Lorenzen for a 21-yard loss. This proved to be the pivotal point in the game as the Huskies were unable to advance the ball, and in fact, turned the ball over on another botched snap from the gun, sealing a 17-16 victory for the Hoos.

Louisville

The Huskies again returned to the friendly confines of Rentschler Field for a heavily anticipated match-up with conference foe Louisville. Weather conditions were less than ideal as heavy rains had pounded Connecticut throughout the day. After holding the Cardinals high powered offense to just seven points in the first half. Momentum soon swung in the favor of the Huskies, just moments into the third quarter. A controversial 76-yard punt return by Larry Taylor knotted the game at 7-7. It appeared as though Taylor had called for a fair catch; however, no whistle was blown, allowing him to run down the sideline for the score against a Louisville return team which had let up due to the apparent fair catch. After a field goal and a fumble return, the Cardinals appeared to be up for good with just over ten minutes left. A Tyler Lorenzen touchdown pass to quarterback-turned-wide receiver D.J. Hernandez pulled the Huskies to within three points. After a defensive stop, the Huskies drove down the field, and Andre Dixon scored the game-winning touchdown with 1:32 left to play. Linebacker Danny Lansanah cemented the victory picking off Cardinals quarterback Brian Brohm with 15 seconds to play. The win improved Connecticut's record to 6-1, making the Huskies bowl eligible for the third time in school history.

South Florida

Back in East Hartford for the second of three straight home games, the Huskies looked to make a statement against 10th ranked South Florida. On yet another rainy Connecticut afternoon, UConn jumped out to an early 3-0 lead. On the ensuing possession, USF marched down the field, but were unable to capitalize as kicker Delbie Alvarado missed a 26-yard field goal. Midway through the second quarter, Quarterback Tyler Lorenzen hooked up with TE Steve Brouse for a three-yard touchdown pass. On the next possession, Linebacker Scott Lutrus intercepted a Matt Grothe pass, and returned it 23 yards for a touchdown. The interception was Lutrus' fourth of the year, and second returned for a touchdown. The score put UConn up 16-0, after a botched extra point attempt. The score held going into the half. South Florida finally lit up the scoreboard with just over six minutes to play in the third quarter on a blocked punt, which was covered up in the endzone by the Huskies for a safety. After the free kick, Matt Grothe took just :29 to scamper for two runs and pull the Bulls closer. After a sandwich of a UConn and USF field goals (UConn, USF, USF, UConn). South Florida began to drive down the field with 5:19 left. After getting into the redzone down 7, the Bulls were unable to capitalize, as a 3-yard touchdown run was called back due to a holding call. On the next play, Grothe was sacked by Redshirt freshman Greg Robinson. On the final play, Grothe passed incomplete into the corner of the endzone, sealing the 22-15 victory for the Huskies. The win was the first ever for the Huskies against a ranked opponent, and the students celebrated by rushing the field.

Rutgers

At Rentschler Field for the finale of a three-game homestand the Huskies  were the favorite against the rival Rutgers. Uconn started the game with a blocked Jeremy Ito punt by quarterback, turned wide receiver D.J. Hernandez which went for a safety. After the punt, Uconn progressed to drive down the field as junior college transfer Tyler Lorenzen hit Steve Brouse on a short two yard out route in the endzone. Tony Ciaravino missed the extra point making the score 8-0 Uconn. Rutgers came right back with a Ray Rice 45-yard run and eventually an Ito 30-yard field goal making the score 8-3. Tyvon Branch came back with a 48-yard return and Ciaravino hit a 44-yard field goal increasing the lead to 11-3. Uconn had good field possession late in the first quarter and Lorenzen hooked up with wide out Terrence Jeffers for 34 yards. Rutgers preceded to march down with a long drive ending with another Ito field goal in the second quarter. On the kickoff, Tyvon Branch took the ball to the outside juking in and then speeding to the outside of Ito for a 97-yard return. Rutgers drove again ending with a Ray Rice 4-yard touchdown run. After a Uconn punt Rutgers ended the half with another Ito field goal. In the third quarter Ito hit another field goal from 27 yards after multiple punts from both teams. Uconn drove again and with Andre Dixon out of the game, the ball was handed to sophomore Donald Brown who found a large hole on the right side and took it for a 33-yard touchdown. After a missed Ito field goal Ciaravino came back with a 30 yarder of his own. After a Rutgers punt Ciaravino hit another field goal this one from 26 yards. After Rutgers drove to the Uconn 35, with 8:17 to go in the 4th Quarter Rutgers failed on a fourth and four. After a Desi Cullen punt for Uconn, a Robert McClain interception of Mike Teel, and another Cullen punt. Teel drove again and at one point completed 6 passes in a row until time ran out. This win gave Uconn an 8-1 record and Donald Brown came off the bench and ran for 154 yards and a touchdown. Ray Rice was held to less than 30 yards in the second half and Tyvon Branch was subsequently named Big East special teams player of the week.

Cincinnati

The Cincinnati Bearcats beat the UConn Huskies behind a strong performance by the Bearcats' quarterback Ben Mauk.   Mauk threw for 276 yards and 3 touchdowns with 21 completions on 33 attempts.   He also added a rushing touchdown.  The Huskies managed only one scoring drive, an 11-play, 74-yard drive in 2nd quarter, resulting in a field goal.

Syracuse

This is senior day for 11 seniors including leaders Dan Davis and Danny Lansanah, along with 27-year-old Zak Penwell. Other seniors include specials team phenom Larry Taylor and corner Tyvon Branch. The win made UConn the second team in the history of the Big East to finish a season with 7 wins at home, joining the 1993 West Virginia Mountaineers.

West Virginia

West Virginia's blowout victory over the Huskies resulted in a sarcastic running joke in the UConn student paper, the Daily Campus. Variations on the joke, "West Virginia just scored again," began running in the paper's InstantDaily feature the Monday following the game and continued well into the Spring 2008 semester.

Meineke Car Care Bowl

The Huskies got invited to their second bowl game.

Rankings

Roster

References

Connecticut
UConn Huskies football seasons
Big East Conference football champion seasons
Connecticut Huskies football